Uglies is a book series by Scott Westerfeld for young adults. Westerfeld originally intended for Uglies to be a trilogy. However, after publishing the series' first three novels, Uglies, Pretties, and Specials, he ultimately wrote an additional fourth book, Extras. This fourth book is dedicated "[t]o everyone who wrote to me to reveal the secret definition of the word 'trilogy'." On February 2, 2018, Westerfeld announced a continuation of the series consisting of four new novels, the first one being Impostors, that was released in September 2018.

The first three novels focus on the exploits of Tally Youngblood. In the post-apocalyptic future society where Tally lives, teenagers, upon reaching their sixteenth birthday, undergo a surgery to mold them into a so-called “Pretty.” When Tally's new friend Shay runs away to the Smoke, a secret refuge for those who oppose the city's government, the future of Tally's own operation becomes uncertain. Dr. Cable, the head of the mysterious Special Circumstances, cuts Tally a deal: betray her friends and help the city locate the runaways or remain an "Ugly" forever. When Tally joins the Smokies, she learns a chilling truth: the surgeries that the city performs are not just intended to render its inhabitants beautiful. The city also puts lesions into the minds of the "Pretties", making them shallow, unintelligent, and ultimately an easier to control population. Over the course of the novels, Tally struggles to maintain her sense of self within a society that literally alters how people think and ultimately succeeds in undoing the system of mind alteration.

The fourth novel centers on Aya Fuse, a girl struggling to find her place in the chaotic world after Tally frees people to think for themselves.

Setting
In humanity's future, a new type of society has been formed after a disastrous oil-bug was released upon the planet that killed 98% of the human population and left many cities in ruins. The new society is composed of about one hundred small post-scarcity, independently run city states, spread out across the seven continents, which now have different coastlines because of modern-societies' global warming. Tally's city is located somewhere in Washington state, west of the Cascade Mountains. The new society holds three values at its core: Sustainability, Peace, and Equality. The new society promotes these values through the use of The Surge, a type of extreme cosmetic surgery that all citizens undergo at the age of 16. The Surge transforms ordinary humans into paragons of beauty, right down to perfect facial symmetry. New Pretties are given access to life in New Pretty Town, the innermost part of the city where food, shelter, and entertainment are provided by the government free of charge. Within the post-Surge part of a persons life, everyone's common beauty inspires peace and equality among the citizens.

Inspiration for the series
In an interview with Simon and Schuster's book newsletter, author Scott Westerfeld talks about the inspiration behind the series. Westerfeld thinks that the future will allow people greater control over their appearance: "We are definitely heading toward a world in which lots of people will get to decide how they look. That will change what we think of as beautiful, and what beauty means to us." In light of this Westerfeld "wanted to write a future in which these technologies were fairly common."

Westerfeld also cites "Liking What You See: A Documentary" by Ted Chiang as an inspiration.

Additionally, the series shares many of its themes with the 1964 The Twilight Zone episode "Number Twelve Looks Just Like You."  In a blog posting, the author of the books notes that he had seen the episode in his childhood and had forgotten all the details.

Social age groups

Littlies
Littlies are young children. They live with their parents in the suburbs surrounding New Pretty Town, and they will attend elementary school until they turn twelve. They become uglies during their preteen years.

Uglies
When children turn 12 years old they are considered "Ugly", because of the burgeoning physical developments experienced by all preteens and teens. Uglies are then moved out of the suburbs and live in monitored dorms in Uglyville, where they attend middle and high school. Uglies are encouraged to call each other nicknames based on their personal imperfections (e.g.: Fatty, Skinny, Squint, or Zits), as well as to use software to generate preferences for their facial features. The former and latter are both methods of building up the Uglies' anticipation for the Pretty operations they will undergo upon turning 16. Unbeknownst to them, Uglies are also monitored by city authorities, not to restrain their behavior but to see which of them are most capable of 'pulling tricks' such as sneaking out at night and into New Pretty Town. This information is used in the Uglies' later life to determine whether they are capable of holding jobs that require decisiveness, initiative, and independent thinking, such as being a surgeon, a firefighter or a Special.

New Pretties
When an Ugly turns 16 they undergo a massive Operation that makes them perfect in beauty and health. The Operation completely overhauls a person's body structure and also includes lesions upon the brain, which makes them compliant and less likely to cause conflict. The lesions also tend to "dumb them up." They become New Pretties and are moved into apartments or mansions in New Pretty Town. New Pretties do not have to work; the only thing they do in New Pretty Town is have fun and maintain an active social life.
New Pretties generally join popular cliques, such as the Swarm (who only go places massed into large groups), the Hot Airs (whose favored pastime is floating in hot air balloons), and the Crims. The Crims commonly consist of those who pulled the most tricks when they were Uglies, and are therefore considered to have a 'criminal' past, hence the name.

Middle Pretties
Middle Pretties have picked their professions and gone through a second, minor operation that makes them look older and wiser, but still beautiful. They then move to the suburbs and are allowed to marry and have children, but are encouraged to do so only every 10 years, so as to discourage the formation of sibling bonds, and to ensure that the population of the city doesn't rise over capacity. Middle pretties are the working class. The Middle Pretties' Littlies (children) are allowed to stay with their parents until they turn 12.

Late Pretties
"Late Pretties, or "Crumblies" (Littlies, uglies, and new pretties may refer to their parents as crumblies, even if they are still middle pretties), are parents, grandparents, great-grandparents, etc. They live in assisted living homes and receive life extension surgery that allows them to live into their middle hundreds and two-hundreds.

Specials (Optional)
Uglies are "surveillanced" (surveilled) by Special Circumstances to see if they have what it takes to become a Special. The security system in Pretty Town is "too easy" to hack and trick. It is believed that the Specials were created by Dr. Cable to stop humans from expanding into the wild or resisting the cities. Specials are described as frighteningly beautiful and as a "cruel pretty" with features like large coal black eyes, sharp cheekbones ...etc. They undergo a special surgery that gives them the ability to feel vibrations with their hands, enhanced senses, muscles sheathed with self-repairing mono filament, sharp orbital alloy teeth, incredible reflexes, bones made out of aircraft ceramics (light as bamboo and hard as diamonds). Furthermore, they are implanted with skintenna, an antenna implanted on their spine which allows them to hear/see what the others are doing, talk to each other, or listen to music. They are also very strong.

The Surge
The Surge (also called The Operation) is an internationally standardized and performed medical procedure mandated by the new society that plays a central part in the plot of the Uglies series. The Surge consists of many steps, taking place over a single twenty-four-hour period, half of which is spent in anaesthetic stasis. The Surge is mostly cosmetic, but also involves major surgery being performed on the nervous, immune, and neurological systems. The point of The Surge itself is to promote and inspire peace among its recipients, with the idea that beauty ultimately trumps all forms of inequality and bigotry - Things like race and orientation don't matter when everyone is beautiful. The Surge is performed at the age of sixteen on every citizen in the world (although some cities perform it at age 18, and is hinted to be performed at 15 in some) and is strictly regulated by The International Committee For Morphological Standards ("The Pretty Committee"), which converges yearly to exchange notes on things such as innovations, anaesthesia techniques, and standard levels of attraction worldwide (because of the cities attitude towards codependence, these meetings are mostly just to make sure every city is making their recipients the same kind of pretty, and to not have any one city have more attractive post-ops).

The schedule for The Surge is as follows:

24 hours before: No food or liquid is to be ingested by the patient. It is requested that the patient rests as much as possible beforehand and dressed comfortably for the operation. It is also asked that the patient does not pack heavily for their transition into New Pretty Town, as they will most likely throw it away afterwards.

1 hour before: The patient is collected by a warden of the state and is taken into peaceful custody. They are delivered to the city hospital and are taken to a waiting room while their operation tank is prepared.

10 minutes before: the patient is stripped of all clothing and is lowered into a Surge Tank, a large glass tube which suspends the body in a thick fluid swarming with nanobots which deliver nutrients and oxygen to the body. The patient is anaesthetised.

At this point, The Surge begins. The first step involves grinding away the patients skin and replacing it with new grafts, which are incapable of scarring, burning, or bruising. The patient is then transformed from the top down, starting with giving the face perfect symmetrical proportions and new plastic cheekbones. Natural teeth are replaced with teeth made of aircraft ceramic. Eyes are replaced, or at least altered, to give added shine, colour and depth. After this, the patients nervous system is fine tuned for better reaction times and higher self-awareness. The skeletal structure is changed for a more attractive body shape and height, and joints are padded for ease. Bodily organs are improved or replaced, and the immune system of the patient is technologically enhanced. After this, the final step of the invasive surgery is to create small lesions on the upper parts of the brain. These lesions impede creativity, violent behaviour, apathy, dysphoria, adrenaline release, and cause the new pretties to forget grudges. These lesions ensure that The Surge works to its full potential of inspiring peace, as the impeded aspects could cause chaos if left unaltered. To allow the body time to recuperate, burn away unwanted fat, and to allow the musculature of the patient to be altered to a beneficial state, the patient is put under electrolysis for 8–10 hours. When the patient is taken off electrolysis and wakes up, the surgery is considered complete.

For about two weeks afterwards, the patient experiences extremely sensitive skin, as their new grafts toughen up to withstand pressure. This sensitivity is likened to having extremely bad sunburn.

This operation, performed at the median age of sixteen, is only the first of many surgeries. When a new pretty reaches a certain age (25 or so), they are given the surgery that transforms them into middle-pretties. This surgery is entirely cosmetic (unless the pretty is entering a job which requires creativity and quick-thinking, in which case, some lesions are removed), and can be performed in an afternoon. The second Surge gives the pretty light crows feet and a few grey hairs, which inspire trust and authority. There is no official third surgery, though a crumbly can undergo multiple life-extension surgeries which allow them to live into their mid two-hundreds comfortably and attractively.

The Cures

The Pretty Cures

Initial Pill Treatment 
The first cure Maddy developed consisted of two pills. In the first pill, the nanos (tiny robot machinery widely used throughout the prettytown) were to break down the lesions. The nanos in the second pill were to stop the nanos in the first pill from spreading. Both pills were to be taken together. Since Zane only took the first pill, his brain was permanently damaged, which ultimately led to his paralysis and later, death.

Later Pill Treatment 
The second cure consisted of only one pill needed for the treatment of the lesions. Maddy made the pills much safer; instead of removing a part of the brain, it stimulated the brain to work around the lesions. The Smokies, in partnership with another city, Diego, mass distributed the pills across the world, causing the "Mind Rain", which marked the end of the prettytime. In the second book Tally cures herself by rewiring herself.

Unassisted Cure
Pretties are able to cure their own brain lesions by feeling "bubbly" enough, i.e. participating in activities which stimulate the brain and increase brain chemicals. Daring, dangerous, or thrilling acts all cause the "bubbly" feeling, as well as physical pain and heightened emotional states, such as stress or interest. Pretties who are self motivated enough to continue undertaking challenging actions can eventually cure their own brain lesions, which is considered a sign they are suitable for higher-skilled jobs, such as government positions, doctors, or Specials, once they become Middles.

Pain was used by Shay in Pretties to feel 'bubbly'. Unlike other cures, it needed to be done frequently and wasn't long-term, just staving it off for a bit.

The Special Cure
After she created the pills curing pretty lesions, Maddy created a cure for Specials. Unlike the pills, the Special Cure had to be injected with a needle. This cure didn't remove the "scary" appearance (sharp teeth and fingernails), but it removed the lesions in the brain, like the pills. After the mind rain, Tally is the only Special in existence from her city without the Special Cure. All other Specials were either despecialized or have an unknown status.  However, it is implied that Tally again rewired her brain so that she can have an incredible body, but still have control over her own thoughts.

Characters

Tally Youngblood
Tally is the protagonist of the books, first appearing in Uglies as a young, 15-year-old girl, waiting for her 16th birthday so that she can be turned pretty. Throughout the series, Tally undergoes significant changes physically and mentally from Ugly, to Pretty, to Special, different classes of citizen in her city. Tally is also known as Tally-wa, and Squint, throughout the  series.

Ugly

Tally has frizzy, curly hair, "squinty" eyes, and a patchy complexion with a wide forehead, a squashed-in nose and thin lips. Her nickname is "Squint". She notes to her best friend, Shay, that she likes the left side of her face more than the right, which is symbolic because that side is the one Tally hates most because her left eye is barely "squintier" than her right.

Pretties

As a pretty, Tally takes on the appearance of other pretties her age: perfect teeth, jawbone, complexion, large hypnotic eyes, slim frame and full lips. Her frizzy hair becomes sleek, curly and shiny and her eye color is changed to silver. As a pretty, Tally is vapid and shallow, side effects of brain alterations, also called lesions, secretly performed during the pretty surgery. However, when her brain is stimulated and adrenaline is released during a crisis situation, she becomes "bubbly", her mind sharpens and her attitude swings around, resembling that of her ugly attitude in its rebellion.

Extras
Set a few years after the Mind-Rain, Aya Fuse's city comes up with a reputation economy, an economy in which people with a higher reputation get more things. Aya Fuse wanted to be famous, and she joins the Sly Girls. They let her in the clique because they trust her not to be a kicker, however, she deceives them and kicks them. They discover in the hollowed out mountain that there may be someone out to destroy the city. Tally Youngblood hears about this, and later shows up to check everything out. Tally Youngblood is the most famous person in the world and Aya Fuse later becomes the third most famous person in the city.

Shay
Shay is Tally's on and off best friend throughout the series. They meet when Tally returns from visiting her friend Peris in New Pretty Town. Shay believes Tally can keep the secret about The Smoke. Dr. Cable forces Tally to follow Shay to the Smoke by threatening to withhold her operation. Shay becomes a pretty, and Tally follows, and once again when she becomes a Cutter for Dr. Cable. Shay also becomes cured of her specialness near the end of the third book and remains in Diego. Shay and Tally are often in disagreement about David and Zane. Even though Shay can sometimes seem deeply flawed, she is still one of Tally's true friends.

David
David is Tally and Shay's contact from "The Smoke". Shay met David when her friends were running away from the city, because David led them to "The Smoke" and showed them they could live out in the wild. David is the son of Maddy and Az; he was born and raised in the wild, after his parents left Tally's city. He is also in love with Tally, due to her seriousness while she was in the Smoke. But before she arrived, David was dating Shay, which causes tension between Tally and Shay throughout the first two books. In the end of Specials, he accompanies Tally in creating the new "Special Circumstances" that is it set on keeping the Wild safe, and making sure people weren't pushing too far. David never surged to become a "pretty", and is the only main character who was left ugly. At the conclusion of Extras, Aya notices David and Tally's closeness, confirming that, at the series' end, David and Tally are a couple.

Maddy and Az
Maddy and Az are David's mother and father. They are from Tally's city, but they ran away. Maddy was on The Committee for Morphological Standards (A.K.A. The Pretty Committee) and had begun doing some research on how to make the operation safer for everyone. She noticed lesions in the brains of all New Pretties, most Middle Pretties, although Late Pretties were never mentioned. She began doing more research, but Special Circumstances showed up and forced her to discontinue her research, or lose her medical license. She and Az became suspicious, fled the city, and established "The Smoke".  Later in the series Maddy discovers a single pill cure, followed by a cure for specials injected by a needle. Az is also killed later on in the first book. They help Tally with some things.

Croy
Croy is one of Shay's friends who moved out to The Smoke. He is suspicious of Tally most of the time, but after she fights against the specials, he trusts her. He brings the cure to Tally at the beginning of Pretties after crashing a party.

Peris
Peris is Tally's  childhood friend. Peris was older than Tally, therefore he got the operation before Tally. Peris is a member of The Crims, and has been a pretty through all of the books.  He is also a very understated character throughout the series. Peris was Tally's best friend until he left her to jump alone off the hot air-balloon.

Dr. Cable
Dr. Cable is the head of Special Circumstances. Dr. Cable is described by Tally as a cruel pretty with cruel features. In the third book (Specials) Dr. Cable and Shay turn Tally into one of the cutters and Tally joins their big team of Special Circumstances. By the end of the third book [Specials], Dr. Cable is cured by Tally Youngblood. Dr. Cable then helps Tally Youngblood escape just before Tally goes under despecializing operation because she wished for at least one of her creation [Specials] to remain alive.

Zane
Zane is the leader of the Crim clique, and almost became a Smokey, but at the last minute he backed out and he became a pretty. He becomes close friends with Tally, and they eventually start dating. When they received Maddy's cure, Tally and Zane each took one pill. The cure included one pill that contained nanos that eats the lesions in the Pretties' brains and one pill that stops the nanos from making you braindead ( Zane took the nanos and since he didn't have the other pill to control them, he became braindead). This had dire effects on Zane's health. As a Special, Tally struggled with past memories of Zane and his "weaknesses" and tremors caused by the brain damage, affecting Zane's relationship with her.

Fausto 
Fausto is another Crim who made it to The Smoke. He later becomes a special, and is kidnapped by the New Smokies, who experiment on him for a cure for Specials.

Andrew Simpson Smith
A villager from a reserve used by anthropologists to study human nature. Andrew Simpson Smith helps Tally escape the reservation. Which is an area in the wild outside the cities used for an experiment, fenced in like an animal; Andrew and the villagers call the dolls on the fence [little men] and believes it is invincible. Later in [Specials] it is told Andrew freed himself by burning the [little men] and aids the New Smokies by handing location positioners. Andrew Simpson Smith thought of Pretties as gods because of their beautiful features.

Aya Fuse
Aya Fuse (pronounced EYE-a FOOZ-eh) is the protagonist for the book Extras. While the world suffers from a metal shortage, she discovers a secret stash of metal, which she believed was to be used for weapons. She then allies with Tally Youngblood and her friends to find out the purpose for the metal stash.

Moggle
Moggle is Aya's hovercam. He gives Aya someone to talk to, and is also helpful in many situations in the book. Moggle follows Aya and he takes photos of the Sly Girls for Aya's kick stories.

Hiro Fuse
Hiro is Aya's older brother. He is popular in their reputation-based city and is invited to the Thousand Faces Club, which consists of the top 1,000 popular people in the book.

Frizz Mizuno
A leader of a clique called "Radical Honesty", where the members must have a brain surgery that gets rid of all deception. He becomes Aya's boyfriend. His surgery did not agree somewhat with the story as he was unable to hide anything, and it especially did not agree with Tally. She convinced him that he was not strong enough to tell the truth all the time (he took the surgery because he lied constantly, especially to girls).

Ren Machino
Hiro's technologically gifted friend. He installed the mods on Moggle to make him waterproof, able to fly and carry Aya, and fitted Moggle with artificial intelligence.

Ellie and Sol Youngblood
Tally's parents. Tally mentions that she had never been that close to them, calling them "Ellie" and "Sol" rather than "Mom" and "Dad". Though this is normal in the Uglies universe since the Bubblehead Regime during Prettytime severs family bonds at twelve years old. They visit Tally in the first book and are only briefly mentioned in later books.

Ho
Ho is a Cutter, and was one of the original Cutters.

Tachs
Tachs is a Cutter, and was also a Smokey.

The Smoke
The Smoke is an established camp in the wilderness, where runaways from cities gathered to avoid the lesions included in the pretty operation.

The Old Smoke
The Old Smoke was established by Maddy and Az (David's parents) in a remote location in the wilderness near railroad tracks and a forest. Maddy and Az created it because they found out a secret about the operation. The Old Smoke was destroyed at the end of the first book Uglies, by Special Circumstances. Tally Youngblood accidentally alerted Special Circumstances when she threw her tracker pendant into a fire, as a show of trust and caring for David and The Smoke.

The New Smoke
The New Smoke was thought to be a new camp in the wilderness, but the Smokies formed a partnership with the city of Diego and settled there.

Cities

Tally's City
A name is never given to Tally's city. It is north-east of Diego, and east of The Rusty Ruins. In Bogus To Bubbly, there is a map showing North America in the future. The rusty city nearest to Tally's city is Seattle, Washington.

Diego
Diego is assumed to be San Diego, but in the future.
Diego does not follow the Committee for Morphological Standards regulations about surgeries, and the fashion trends in Diego are very diverse, but at times bizarre to outsiders. The New Smokeys distributed "The Cure" in Diego, and partnered with the local government. Diego supplies the Smokeys with the cure, sneak suits, a city to take refuge in, and removal of the lesions by a doctor in a safe hospital setting.

The Rusty Ruins
The Rusty Ruins are west of Tally's city and are the remainders of Seattle, Washington. They have been preserved so that children can see what the Rusties did to the world. They are a gathering place for uglies who want to trick the sensors on their hoverboards. David meets up with potential Smokeys in the ruins.

Post Rusty Singapore
As part of the extras plan to launch a shuttle into space so that they have a smaller effect on the earth, they harvest metal from Singapore to build their shuttles. Aya, Hiro, Frizz, and the Cutters visit the ruins with the Extras.

Yokohama
Yokohama is the home city of Aya Fuse in Extras. The cities name is never mentioned in the book, but in early drafts when Hiro was the main character, he refers to the city as Yokohama. The city is not shown to have any rusty ruins near it, so it is presumed to be built over the remains of the modern-day city of Yokohama, since Aya describes her apartment in Shuffle Mansion as having a view of mountains and of a coast; modern day eastern Yokohama has a view of both. Also, the large mountain that Aya and the Sly Girls visit multiple times in the story is presumed to be Mount Fuji.

Londinium
Only mentioned once in Extras, when Tally says that metal has been disappearing from the rust ruins near the city. It is presumed that Londinium is built near or on the ruins of London.

Prettytime Architecture

New Pretty Town
New Pretty Town is where all of the new pretties live. They are full of parks, mansions named after famous people from the Rusty Time, and amusements for New Pretties after they've become new pretties. In Tally's city, New Pretty Town is separated from the rest of the city by a river, and the bridges report people when they cross the bridge. The exception is an older bridge, which Tally uses to sneak across the river and gatecrash a party that Peris was attending. Later, Tally needs a diversion in the city, and she tells some uglies about the bridge.
Four mansions are named - Valentino Mansion, the oldest building in New Pretty Town, Garbo Mansion, Komachi Mansion, and Pulcher Mansion.

Uglyville/Dorms
Uglyville is made up of schools and dorms for all of the citizens from ages 12–16. The uglies are encouraged to hoverboard and play in the Greenbelt, and act out their random impulses away from all the other age groups.

The Burbs
The Burbs are home to Late Pretties, Middle pretties and their Littlies.

The Factory Belt
In the prettytime, everyone has a "hole in the wall" where they can ask the wall for a piece of clothing/accessory, and it will give it to them. Certain complex items (like hoverboards, furniture and really nice clothes) had to be requisitioned from the factory belt, where middle pretties assembled the special objects.

The Trails
The trails are a series of trails and camping spots in the wilderness used by pretties of all ages for hiking and camping. One of the perks of this was that if you got tired, you could call a hovercar to come and get you.

The Greenbelt
In Tally's city, the greenbelt separates Uglyville from the Burbs. The greenbelt is for uglies to act out their random impulses. Littlies are discouraged from playing in the greenbelt, so that they don't get lost or hurt.

Floating Ice Rink
In Pretties, the floating ice rink over Nefertiti Stadium is mentioned as a huge architectural feat. Using a grid of lifters to support it and tiny Zambonis to keep it transparent, it hovers over Nefertiti Stadium (which displays firework displays before sports games). Everyone is supposed to wear bungee jackets, in case the rink were to break or stop working - which would have never happened intentionally. But Tally, Zane and the Crims stage a breakthrough by pouring vodka on the ice to reduce freezing temperature, and then putting stress on the ice causing it to break during the firework display (the safety fireworks are designed not to hurt people). The Crims act innocent, but Dr. Cable realized it was planned (there are no mentions of anybody else noticing the Crims never got in trouble).

Garbo Mansion
Garbo Mansion is the house most New Pretties live in. The walls can talk and spit out clothes and certain objects. On the roof is a rack of bungee jackets in case of a fire. In Uglies, Tally Youngblood pulls the fire alarm to access the jackets so she can make a daring escape after seeing Peris.

Film adaptation
In September 2020, a feature film adaptation titled The Uglies was announced to be in development with 20th Century Fox and Joey King signed on to star in the lead role as Tally Youngblood. McG signed on to direct, with Krista Vernoff serving as screenwriter. John Davis, Jordan Davis, Robyn Meisinger, Dan Spilo, McG, and Mary Viola will produce the movie. The project will be a joint-venture production between Davis Entertainment Company, Anonymous Content, Industry Entertainment, Wonderland Sound and Vision, and Netflix Original Films. The film is intended to release through streaming exclusively on Netflix. Later that year, Keith Powers, Brianne Tju, Chase Stokes, and Laverne Cox joined the supporting cast.

In February 2022, King revealed that production had already finished, and had taken place in Atlanta, Georgia in December of 2021.

See also

References

 Westerfeld, Scott. Specials. Simon Pulse 2007.  (pbk).

External links
 Scott Westerfeld Website
 Official Uglies series downloadables site
 Uglies series Reading Group Guide
 Author page at Pulse Blogfest

Fiction set in the 24th century
Novel series